El Mercurio is a newspaper published in Cuenca, Ecuador. It is the city's main newspaper.

References

External links
Official site

Newspapers published in Ecuador